Maurice Taylor Bunyan (11 November 1893 – December 1967) was an English football player and manager active primarily in Belgium and France.

Playing career
Bunyan played as a striker in Belgium for Racing Club de Bruxelles (where he scored 150 goals in 158 matches and in France for Stade Français. He was the topscorer of the Belgian First Division in 1912 and 1914. He also competed for Great Britain at the 1920 Summer Olympics.

Managerial career
Bunyan managed French side Bordeaux between 1945 and 1947. Following his coaching experience, Bunyan wrote a book in French named Le football simplifié, with the help of Jules Rimet. In 1947 he followed Helenio Herrera as a coach of Stade Francais.

Personal life
Bunyan's father was Charles Bunyan Sr. and his brother was Charles Bunyan Jr.

References

1893 births
1967 deaths
English footballers
English football managers
Stade Français (association football) players
FC Girondins de Bordeaux managers
Olympic footballers of Great Britain
Footballers at the 1920 Summer Olympics
K.F.C. Rhodienne-De Hoek players
English expatriate footballers
English expatriate football managers
English expatriate sportspeople in Belgium
English expatriate sportspeople in France
Expatriate footballers in Belgium
Expatriate footballers in France
Expatriate football managers in France
Association football forwards